Dagsboro Hundred is a hundred in Sussex County, Delaware, United States. Dagsboro Hundred was formed in 1773 from Worcester County, Maryland. Its primary community is Millsboro.

References

Hundreds in Sussex County, Delaware